Julius (II) from the kindred Rátót (died after 1279) was a Hungarian distinguished nobleman from the gens Rátót as the son of Baldwin I, master of the cupbearers three times. Julius II married Kunigunda from the kindred Csák. They had two children, Demetrius and Julius III. The latter's daughter, Chuta was the last member of Baldwin's branch.

Julius II appeared in the contemporary records since 1274. He served as master of the cupbearers in 1275. He was appointed judge royal in 1278, at the beginning of the reign of Ladislaus IV of Hungary. Julius replaced his cousin, Roland I Rátót in that position. After that he functioned as Wildgrave of Bakony in 1279. His predecessor Csák from the kindred Csák was mentioned as "perpetuus comes de Bokon" (perpetual ispán) in 1270, thus Julius II might be the court ispán (curialis comes) i. e. judge royal (later iudex curie) in 1279 too. However, Julius was the husband of Kunigunda Csák; thus, he also belonged to the Csák clan.

References

Sources
  Markó, László (2006). A magyar állam főméltóságai Szent Istvántól napjainkig – Életrajzi Lexikon ("The High Officers of the Hungarian State from Saint Stephen to the Present Days – A Biographical Encyclopedia") (2nd edition); Helikon Kiadó Kft., Budapest; .
  Zsoldos, Attila (2011). Magyarország világi archontológiája, 1000–1301 ("Secular Archontology of Hungary, 1000–1301"). História, MTA Történettudományi Intézete. Budapest. 

Julius II
Judges royal
13th-century Hungarian people
Masters of the cupbearers